Eristalis horticola is a Palearctic species of hoverfly.

Description
External images
For terms see Morphology of Diptera
Wing length 8·25-11·5 mm. Face pale dusted, black median stripe broad. Antennomere 3 brown-black. Tergite 2 dull, even on the yellow spots. All Abdominal spots yellowish. Wing with dark clouding, more developed in the female. Femur 3 pale at the base in male and for basal half in female. The larva is aquatic.

Distribution
Palaearctic Fennoscandia South to the Mediterranean basin and North Africa. Ireland East through Europe into Russia and the Russian Far East, through Siberia to the Pacific coast (Sakhalin). India.

Biology
The habitat is wetland, deciduous forest, temperate coniferous forests, boreal forests, taiga, montane tundra, fen, cut-over valley bog, margins of pools, streams and rivers.
Flowers visited include yellow composites; white umbellifers, Compositae, Ranunculaceae, Umbelliferae, Calluna vulgaris, Cardamine, Cirsium, Crataegus, Eupatorium, Galium, Jasione, Pyrus communis, Ranunculus, Rubus fruticosus, Rubus idaeus, Sambucus, Sorbus aucuparia, Stellaria, Succisa, Viburnum opulus.

Flies May to September.

Scientific name 
The scientific name of this species was published as Musca horticola in 1776 by Charles De Geer. The name has been in general use as Eristalis horticola (De Geer, 1776) in the two centuries following its publication. On the basis of a colour plate of Musca lineata, by Moses Harris, also published in 1776, the latter name was generally accepted as a junior synonym of Musca horticola.

At the end of the twentieth century, some entomologists noted that De Geer erroneously listed Musca nemorum Linnaeus, 1758 as a synonym under Musca horticola, which would invalidate the name. As a result of some confusion about the type material of Musca nemorum, some entomologists already regarded that name as a synonym of Musca arbustorum Linnaeus, 1758. The same authors therefore also placed Musca horticola in the synonymy of Eristalis arbustorum. They proposed to use the next available scientific names for both species, and to use the name Eristalis interrupta (Poda, 1761) for the species known until then as Eristalis nemorum, and to use the name Eristalis lineata (Harris, 1776) for the species known as Eristalis horticola for over two centuries. Because the names E. nemorum and E. horticola had been in use for more than two centuries for well-defined species, and because the stability of the names was not served by the proposed new names, in 2004 Peter Chandler, Andrew Wakeham-Dawson and Angus McCullough submitted a request to the International Commission on Zoological Nomenclature to conserve both names with a neotype. The request was granted less than two years after its submission. In various overviews and also in Fauna Europaea, the names proposed by Thompson et al. can still be found instead of the conserved ones.

References

Diptera of Europe
Eristalinae
Insects described in 1776
Taxa named by Charles De Geer